William McNamara (born 1965) is an American actor.

William McNamara may also refer to:

William J. McNamara (1879–?), mayor of Edmonton
William Craig McNamara (1904–1984), president of the Canadian Wheat Board and Canadian Senator
Bill McNamara (1876–1959), Australian rules footballer
William McNamara (soldier) (1835–1912), Irish-born soldier in the 4th U.S. Army Cavalry
William McNamara (horticulturist), American horticulturist